Son Ho-jun (born June 27, 1984): South Korean actor 
 Son Ho-jun (footballer, born 2002) (born July 3, 2002):  South Korean footballer
 Son Ho-jun (footballer, born 20 July 2002) (born July 20, 2002): South Korean footballer
 Son Ho-jun (footballer, born 2000 (born February 8, 2002): South Korean footballer